Carol Connors (born Annette Kleinbard, November 13, 1941) is an American singer-songwriter. She is perhaps best known as the lead vocalist on the Teddy Bears' single, "To Know Him Is To Love Him", which was written by her bandmate Phil Spector.

Biography

Early life
Connors was born Annette Kleinbard on November 13, 1941, in New Brunswick, New Jersey. Her parents were Polish Jews. She lost many relatives in the Holocaust. She attended Fairfax High School in Los Angeles, California.

Career
She was the lead singer of the pop vocal trio known as the Teddy Bears, which also included Phil Spector. The Teddy Bears' only major hit, "To Know Him Is To Love Him", which Spector wrote specifically to showcase Connors' singing voice, reached No. 1 on the Billboard Hot 100 in late 1958, also becoming the first woman to chart. After their initial hit, the trio disbanded because of the failure of their follow-up singles, and the fact that Spector preferred working behind the scenes to performing.

Some years later she legally changed her name to Carol Connors. She co-wrote (with Ayn Robbins and Bill Conti) "Gonna Fly Now", the theme song from the film Rocky, which earned her an Academy Award nomination. Carol Connors sang the theme to the film Orca, called "We Are One".

Other songwriting credits include the Rip Chords' 1964 hit "Hey Little Cobra", plus the 1980 Billy Preston/Syreeta Wright duet "With You I'm Born Again"; the 1994 title track "For All Mankind" on the debut album of Italian singer Guendalina Cariaggi, which was used as the theme song for a documentary produced by Pier Quinto and Lara Cariaggi, on the legends of soccer and the FIFA World Cup; for "Madonna in the Mirror", the finale song on A&E's 15 Films About Madonna; and three songs – "Condi, Condi", "I Think of You so Fondly", and "Chill, Condi, Chill" – for Courting Condi (2008).

Connors also wrote and performed songs for several films. The 1967 beach-party film Catalina Caper features her song "Book of Love" (not to be confused with the Monotones' song), co-written with Roger Christian, which she performed backed by the Cascades. She co-composed (with Ayn Robbins) three songs for the soundtrack of the 1977 Disney film, The Rescuers: "Tomorrow Is Another Day", "The Journey" and "Someone's Waiting for You". In 1983 Connors was nominated for a Golden Raspberry Award, for the 'Worst Original Song'  for "It's Wrong for Me to Love You", from Butterfly, which she co-composed with Ennio Morricone.

In 2011, she skydived and performed a concert to raise awareness for the Wounded Warrior Project.

A Golden Palm Star on the Palm Springs Walk of Stars was dedicated to her in 1999.

Personal life
Connors lives in Beverly Hills, California.

She testified at the O. J. Simpson trial in 1995. She had seen Simpson at a charity event the night before his ex-wife's murder.

Selected discography
"My Diary" 1961

References

External links
Official Website

[ Songwriting credits @ Allmusic.com]

1940 births
Living people
20th-century American singers
20th-century American women singers
American women singer-songwriters
American people of Polish-Jewish descent
Jewish American musicians
Jewish American songwriters
Jewish women singers
Musicians from Beverly Hills, California
Musicians from New Brunswick, New Jersey
Singer-songwriters from California
Singer-songwriters from New Jersey
21st-century American Jews
21st-century American women
The Teddy Bears members